Conrad is a former unincorporated community in the County of Warner No. 5, Alberta, Canada. The population of the community was fairly small and only had around 5 people with two grain elevators. Today nothing remains of the community, but its original location on the historic Red Coat Trail was 8 km (4 mi) east of the Hamlet of Wrentham and about 24 km (14 mi) west of the Village of Foremost. The community was named by the Canadian Pacific Railway.

Education
Conrad School District No. 4077 was formed on 3 November 1921. The Conrad School District No. 4077 was a one room schoolhouse that once stood at township 11 - 61 - 12 - W4.

Regional attractions

Devil's Coulee Dinosaur Heritage Museum
The Devil's Coulee Dinosaur Heritage Museum features a Hadrosaur (duck-billed dinosaur) nest and embryo, ancient fossils, dinosaur models, located in the Warner.

Galt Historic Railway Park
The Galt Historic Railway Park located 1 km north of Stirling is another popular museum which displays of life and travel in the 1880s to 1920s are set up in the restored 1890 North West Territories International Train Station from Coutts, Alberta, Canada and Sweetgrass, Montana, USA. The station was moved to the current location near Stirling in 2000 and is added onto every year. Future plans to move the 1925 Oglvie grain elevator from Wrentham for display along the station in the  park is still in the planning stages.

Stirling Agricultural Village

Stirling Agricultural Village is a National Historic Site of Canada, and was listed as one of only three communities in Canada designated as a National Historic Site because of the community's well preserved settlement pattern that follows the Plat of Zion model. Located within the village are two museums the Michelsen Farmstead a totally restored 1900s home showcasing rural life in Alberta in the 1930s. Listed as a Provincial Historic Site in 2001., and the Galt Historic Railway Park.

Warner elevator row
The Warner elevator row is a row of historic wood-cribbed grain elevators. A total of six elevators still stand in a row from south to north alongside the Canadian Pacific Railway on the east entrance of the village of Warner. Due to the loss of a vast amount of Alberta's many grain elevators, the elevator row in Warner remains the very last row of elevators in Alberta. Only two elevator rows remain in Canada, Warner's row and the elevators in Inglis, Manitoba.

Waterton Lakes National Park
Waterton Lakes National Park is a National Park located in the extreme southwest corner of Alberta, Canada, 40 km west of Cardston, and borders Glacier National Park in Montana, USA. Waterton Lakes was Canada's fourth National Park formed in 1895.  The Rocky Mountains rise suddenly out of the rolling prairies in the park. Amid the peaks are the three Waterton Lakes, carved out of the rock by ancient glaciers.

Writing On Stone Provincial Park
Writing-on-Stone Provincial Park, is one of the largest areas of protected prairie in the Alberta park system, and serves as both a nature preserve and protection for the largest concentration of rock art, created by Plains People. There are over 50 rock art sites, with thousands of figures, as well as numerous archeological sites.

See also 

 List of communities in Alberta

References

Ghost towns in Alberta
Localities in the County of Warner No. 5
Populated places established in the 1910s